Carl or Karl Smith may refer to:

Arts and entertainment
Carl Frithjof Smith (1859–1917), Norwegian portrait and genre painter
Carl "Tatti" Smith (born 1908), American jazz trumpeter
Carl Smith (musician) (1927–2010), American country music singer

Sports
Carl Smith (ice hockey) (1917–1967), Canadian ice hockey winger
Carl "Buster" Smith (1921–1992), American pool checkers and international draughts player
Carl Smith (American football) (born 1948), American football coach
Carl Smith (rower) (1962–2010), British lightweight rower
Carl Smith (footballer) (born 1979), English professional footballer
Carl Smith (game designer), American game designer

Others
Carl Smith (businessman) (1897–1979), New Zealand businessman
Carl Michael Smith (born 1944), American businessman and politician from Oklahoma
Carl Herbert Smith (1950–2004), American computer scientist
Carl Smith, American politician, candidate in the United States House of Representatives elections in Georgia, 2010

Other uses
Carl Smith Stadium, a stadium in Wise, Virginia

See also
Karl Smith (disambiguation)
Carl Schmidt (disambiguation)
Carl Schmitt (1888–1985), German philosopher, jurist and political theorist